Federal elections were held in Germany on 10 January 1877. The National Liberal Party remained the largest party in the Reichstag, with 127 of the 397 seats. Voter turnout was 60.6%.

Results

Alsace-Lorraine

References

Federal elections in Germany
Germany
1877 elections in Germany
Elections in the German Empire
January 1877 events